Airborne ground surveillance (AGS) refers to a class of military airborne radar system (Surveillance aircraft) used for detecting and tracking ground targets, such as vehicles and slow moving helicopters, as opposed to Airborne early warning and control, whose primary role is detecting and tracking aircraft in flight. Antenna beam width should be very small to enhance resolution. This antenna size limitation demands high frequency (GHz range) of operation, to be operated in this mode. AGS radar is typically a medium or low power radar. It includes both maritime and land surveillance. Today, UAVs perform this operation, which often uses optical aids for surveillance.

Aircraft 
 US Air Force Northrop Grumman E-8 Joint STARS
 US Navy Boeing P-8 Poseidon
 Russian Air Force Tupolev Tu-204R
 British Royal Air Force Raytheon Sentinel
 US Air Force Northrop Grumman RQ-4 Global Hawk
 Tethered Aerostat Radar System
 JLENS

See also
 Intelligence, surveillance, target acquisition, and reconnaissance
 Alliance Ground Surveillance – a NATO programme to acquire an AGS capability.
 Unmanned aerial vehicle
 Synthetic aperture radar
no

External links
 NATO Alliance Ground Surveillance

Radar